The 1998–99 Auburn Tigers men's basketball team represented Auburn University in the 1998–99 college basketball season. The team's head coach was Cliff Ellis, who was in his fifth season at Auburn. The team played their home games at Beard–Eaves–Memorial Coliseum in Auburn, Alabama. They finished the season 29–4, 14–2 in SEC play to win the SEC regular season championship. They defeated Alabama to advance to the semifinals of the SEC tournament where they lost to Kentucky. They received an at-large bid to the NCAA tournament where they defeated Winthrop and Oklahoma State to advance to the Sweet Sixteen where they lost to Ohio State.

Previous season
The Tigers finished the 1997–98 season 16–14, 7–9 in SEC play. They lost to Florida in the first round of the SEC tournament. They received an invitation to the National Invitation Tournament, where they defeated Southern Miss to advance to the second round where they lost to Marquette.

Roster

Schedule and results

|-
!colspan=9 style="background:#172240; color:white;"| Regular season

|-
!colspan=9 style="background:#172240; color:white;" | SEC tournament

|-
!colspan=9 style="background:#172240; color:white;" | NCAA tournament

Rankings

Awards and honors
Chris Porter – SEC Men's Player of the Year

References

Auburn Tigers men's basketball seasons
Auburn
Auburn
Auburn
Auburn